Iceland competed at the 1984 Summer Olympics in Los Angeles, United States.

Medalists

Results by event

Athletics

Men
Track & road events

Field events

Women
Field events

Handball

Summary
Key:
 ET – After extra time
 P – Match decided by penalty-shootout.

Team Roster
Þorbergur Aðalsteinsson
Kristján Arason
Steinar Birgisson
Jens Einarsson
Alfreð Gíslason
Bjarni Guðmundsson
Guðmundur Guðmundsson
Sigurður Gunnarsson
Atli Hilmarsson
Þorbjörn Jensson
Brynjar Kvaran
Þorgils Mathiesen
Jakob Sigurðsson
Sigurður Sveinsson
Einar Þorvarðarson

Judo

 Bjarni Friðriksson - Men's 95 kg 
 Kolbeinn Gíslason - Men's open category

Sailing

Swimming

Men

Women

References

Nations at the 1984 Summer Olympics
1984
Summer Olympics